Joy Ogbonne Eze (born 6 June 2004) is a Nigerian weightlifter. She is a gold medalist in the women's 64 kg event at both the 2019 African Games in Rabat, Morocco and the 2021 African Weightlifting Championships in Nairobi, Kenya.

Career 

She represented Nigeria at the 2019 African Games held in Rabat, Morocco and she won the gold medal in the women's 64kg event. She also won the gold medal in her event at the 2021 African Weightlifting Championships held in Nairobi, Kenya.

She won the bronze medal in the clean & jerk event in the women's 71 kg event at the 2021 World Weightlifting Championships held in Tashkent, Uzbekistan. She finished in 6th place in this competition. She also set new youth records in the clean & jerk and in total. The 2021 Commonwealth Weightlifting Championships were also held at the same time and her total result gave her the gold medal in this event. As a result, she qualified to compete at the 2022 Commonwealth Games in Birmingham, England.

She competed in the women's 71 kg event at the 2022 Commonwealth Games where she lifted 100 kg in the Snatch. She did not register a result in the Clean & Jerk.

Achievements

References

External links 
 

Living people
2004 births
Place of birth missing (living people)
Nigerian female weightlifters
African Games medalists in weightlifting
African Games gold medalists for Nigeria
Competitors at the 2019 African Games
African Weightlifting Championships medalists
Weightlifters at the 2022 Commonwealth Games
Commonwealth Games competitors for Nigeria
21st-century Nigerian women